Jessie Baetz (born Jessie Elizabeth Drummer, June 28, 1894 – 1974 or later) was a Canadian-American artist, composer, and pianist.

Baetz was a native of Toronto, Ontario, Canada, where she studied and taught at the Toronto Conservatory of Music, now known as the Royal Conservatory of Music.  She immigrated to New York City, where 1930s census records list her occupation as "painter," and her art was included in an exhibit at the Jumble Shop on West 8th Street. She studied with another modern composer, Johanna Beyer, played on Beyer's concerts for the New York Composers' Forum, and showed clear signs of Beyer and Henry Cowell's influence in her experimental compositional techniques such as tone clusters, polymeters, and string piano techniques. Her works were performed in the Composers' Forum on December 15, 1937.

Works
Two Compositions for Violin and Piano
Three Vocalizes for Soprano
Six Dances for Percussion

Notes

Further reading
 Staff (June 22, 1966). "Phoenicia Library Has Art Exhibit". The Kingston Daily Freeman. p. 26
 Staff (October 31, 1970). "Art Show With Zing". The Kingston Daily Freeman. p. 35

See also 
 Music of Canada
 List of Canadian composers

20th-century classical composers
Modernist composers
American women classical composers
American classical composers
American contemporary classical composers
Canadian classical composers
Contemporary classical music performers
The Royal Conservatory of Music alumni
Academic staff of The Royal Conservatory of Music
Year of death missing
Canadian emigrants to the United States
Artists from Toronto
Artists from New York City
Musicians from Toronto
Musicians from New York City
20th-century Canadian composers
20th-century American women musicians
20th-century American musicians
20th-century American composers
Modernist women composers
20th-century women composers
American women academics
1894 births
Canadian women composers